Desert Saints is a 2002 crime thriller film starring Kiefer Sutherland as a hitman named Arthur Banks, alongside Melora Walters as Agent Bennie Harper. The film is produced by Meg Ryan.

Plot
Arthur Banks (Kiefer Sutherland) is an Ivy League-educated hitman for Latin American drug cartels who picks up solitary women, uses them as cover for a hit, then kills them. His trademark is a bullet with a tungsten core.  Over the years, he has become wary of the FBI's attempts to catch him, including by use of satellite and security cameras, which leads him to mostly stay in rural desert areas when not working.  The FBI team is spearheaded by Agent George Scanlon (Jamey Sheridan), who lost five years of his career when Banks killed a witness he was guarding 15 years ago while leaving no evidence behind. In a desperation sting, Scanlon plants Agent Bennie Harper (Melora Walters), portraying a drifter, in Banks' path, and Banks picks her up for what he says will be his last job, a hit on a Mexican presidential candidate. Scanlon and Agent Donna Marbury (Leslie Stefanson), along with several support agents, follow Banks and Harper through the Southwest, but the scheme goes wrong when one of the tailing agents is spotted and caught by Banks.

Thinking quickly, the agent pretends to be Harper's jealous and abusive ex-husband, but this plan goes awry when Banks, who seems more interested in Harper than normal, kills the agent out of Harper's sight and then disposes of the body in a manner not witnessed by Harper (incineration), leaving the FBI once again with no evidence to arrest him.  That night, Banks and Harper become lovers at a remote motel. Scanlon decides to cancel the sting after the agent's death and to withdraw Harper, but Harper talks him out of it, pointing out that Banks is their only lead to his employers in the drug cartels. On the road, Banks confides to Harper that he hates his job but hasn't had a chance to get out of it for years until now.

In Mexico, Harper double-crosses both Banks and the FBI, first shooting Banks to stop him from committing the assassination and handcuffing him to the balcony, but then killing the thugs who hired him and taking their key for the payoff from the hit. She tells Banks that she expects the FBI will be so happy to catch and question him that she'll depart with the payoff without much problem, which is why she leaves him alive. However, by the time Scanlon responds to her call on Banks' location, he has escaped. Meanwhile, the FBI agents follow Agent Marbury's sighting of a fleeing Harper to the local airport, only to lose her there, because the "sighting" was actually Marbury herself in a disguise, which she sheds in a washroom, permitting Harper's undetected escape.

In the last scene, Harper and Marbury meet in the desert and kiss, while discussing their new wealth. In the distant brush, we see Banks' boots and bloody hand, unnoticed by the two women. After the screen goes black, we hear a single shot.

Cast
Kiefer Sutherland as Arthur Banks
Melora Walters as Bennie Harper 
Jamey Sheridan as Agent George Scanlon
Leslie Stefanson as Agent Donna Marbury
Alan Gelfant as Byron Sadowski
Keith Diamond as Agent Robinson
Rachel Ticotin as Dora 
Jim Jenkins as Anchorman 
Bill Sage as Davis 
Alex Black as Bobbie 
Beth Grant as Lou
Brent Roam as Concierge 
Shawn Woods as Larson 
Gloria Alexandra as Maria Lopez
Aliza Rajan as Agent McCoy

Home media
The DVD was released September 17, 2002. The film is also available for purchase on Amazon digital.

External links

Political thriller films
2002 crime thriller films
2002 films
American romantic drama films
2002 crime drama films
American crime drama films
2002 drama films
2000s English-language films
2000s American films